Yarm, also referred to as Yarm-on-Tees, is a market town and civil parish in the Borough of Stockton-on-Tees, North Yorkshire, England. It lies on the southern bank of the River Tees on a small peninsula. To the east, it extends to the River Leven, to the south it extends into the Kirklevington.

Yarm bridge marked the river's furthest tidal-flow reaching until a barrage opened to regulate the tide in 1995. It was previously the last bridge before the sea, having been superseded multiple times since. It was first superseded by a toll bridge in 1771, crossing into Stockton-on-Tees

The town's historic county is Yorkshire, the North Riding sub-division. The three sub-divisions had gained separate county status in 1889 before these were abolished in 1974. It is in the borough of Stockton-on-Tees; first when the borough was a county of Cleveland district (1974-1996) and second (from 1996) in its present unitary authority structure. The borough is a constituent member of the Tees Valley combined authority.

History
The name Yarm is thought to be derived from the Old English gearum, dative plural of gear, 'pool for catching fish' (source of the modern dialect word yair with the same meaning), hence 'at the place of the fish pools'.  Yarm was first mentioned in the Domesday Book of 1086, and was originally a chapelry in the Kirklevington parish in the North Riding of Yorkshire; it later became a parish in its own right.

The Yarm helmet is a  Viking age helmet that was found in Yarm. It is the first relatively complete Anglo-Scandinavian helmet found in Britain and only the second Viking helmet discovered in north-west Europe. It is displayed nearby in Preston Park Museum, Preston-on-Tees.

Dominican Friars settled in Yarm about 1286, and maintained a friary and a hospital in the town, until 1583.  Their memory is preserved in the names of Friarage and Spital Bank. The Friarage was built on top of the cellars of a Dominican friary in 1770, for the Meynell family. It is now at the centre of Yarm School.

Bishop Skirlaw of Durham built a stone bridge, which still stands, across the Tees in 1400.  An iron replacement was built in 1805, but it fell down in 1806.  For many years, Yarm was at the tidal limit and head of navigation on the River Tees.

On 1 February 1643, during the First English Civil War, a small Roundhead force attempted to halt the progress of a large waggon-train of arms, landed at Tynemouth and destined to bolster the Royalist war effort in Yorkshire and beyond. Heavily outnumbered and outflanked by Royalist ford crossings, the Parliamentarians were quickly routed and the Royalists gained the bridge, crossing into Yorkshire.

On 12 February 1821, at the George & Dragon Inn, the meeting was held that pressed for the third and successful attempt for a Bill to give permission to build the Stockton & Darlington Railway, the world's first public railway.

In 1890, Bulmer & Co listed twelve inns in Yarm: Black Bull, Cross Keys, Crown Inn, Fleece, George and Dragon, Green Tree, Ketton Ox, Lord Nelson, Red Lion, Three Tuns, Tom Brown, and Union.  Also listed was Cross Keys beside the Leven Bridge.

In the 13th century, Yarm was classed as a borough, but this status did not persist.  It formed part of the Stokesley Rural District under the Local Government Act 1894, and remained so until 1 April 1974 when, under the Local Government Act 1972, it became part of the district of Stockton-on-Tees in the new non-metropolitan county of Cleveland.  Cleveland was abolished in 1996 under the Banham Review, with Stockton-on-Tees becoming a unitary authority.

Geography

Yarm is bordered by two rivers, the River Tees to the north, and the River Leven to the east.  The Leven is a tributary of the Tees.  Yarm was once the highest port on the Tees.

Two road bridges cross the river, Yarm Bridge crossing from the High Street to Eaglescliffe, which is Grade II* listed, and Leven Bridge crossing the Leven between Yarm and Low Leven, which is Grade II listed.  On 26 February 2010, Leven Bridge was closed after cracks appeared in it. Repairs took less time than expected, and the bridge re-opened on 18 June 2010.

Yarm Town Hall in the High Street was built in 1710 by Thomas Belasyse, 3rd Viscount Fauconberg who was Lord of the Manor.  In a poll taken for the BBC's Breakfast programme on 19 January 2007, Yarm's High Street was voted the 'Best High Street': the street and its cobbled parking areas is fronted by many Georgian-style old buildings, with their red pantile roofs.

The A67, which runs through High Street was previously classified as the A19 until a dual carriageway was built in the 1970s, about three miles south of the town near the village of Crathorne. When the A19 ran through High Street, it was heavily congested.  The road was used by heavy goods traffic as a shortcut to Teesside International Airport.  The classification of the road as an 'A'-road meant that it was difficult to place a ban on heavy goods vehicles; however the town council made efforts to come up with voluntary agreements with many haulage firms until 2012, when all HGV traffic was banned from the route through Yarm and Egglescliffe.

The Rookery is a public area by the River Tees situated at the bottom of Goose Pasture.  The ash, sycamore and lime woodland is about 200 years old and owned by Yarm Town Council.  In 2002, a walkway was constructed around the wood to celebrate the Golden Jubilee of Queen Elizabeth II.  Within the woodland, close to the river, BMX riders have created numerous dirt ramps which are regularly used during summer months.

Governance

House of Commons
Yarm is part of the Stockton South Parliamentary Constituency which is represented in the House of Commons of the UK Parliament since 14 December 2019 by Matt Vickers, a Conservative MP.

It was represented from 8 May 2017 by Dr Paul Williams (Labour), "a local GP" who lost his seat at the 2019 General Election.

From 2010 to 2017 the constituency was represented by James Wharton (Conservative); He was elected on 6 May 2010 for Stockton South. James Wharton was re-elected with an increased majority on 7 May 2015. In August 2016 he was appointed Parliamentary Under-Secretary of State at the Department for International Development.

From 1997 to 2010, the constituency was represented by Dari Taylor (Labour).

House of Lords
On the morning of 2 September 2020, the former MP, James Wharton, was created Baron Wharton of Yarm, after being nominated in Prime Minister Boris Johnson's 2020 Dissolution Honours List. He was introduced on 10 September, becoming the youngest member of the House of Lords at 36, and the first member of the House of Lords to retrieve their title from the area.

Borough Council
The Yarm ward of Stockton, which includes Kirklevington, has three local councillors sitting on Stockton-on-Tees Borough Council.

From 5 May 2011, Conservatives Mark Chatburn, Ben Houchen, and Andrew Sherris became the councillors on the Stockton on Tees Borough Council for the Yarm Ward.  Mark Chatburn subsequently defected to UKIP on 22 March 2013.

Town council
Yarm has a town council which is responsible for certain aspects of the town's administration, including allotments and the cemetery. It meets once a month in the town hall.

The council has eleven seats with a chairman who, for ceremonial purposes, is 'Mayor'. The Standing Orders of the Council restrict the chairman's period of office to two years in any four-year period.  The 2015 chairman was Clr Jason Hadlow. Elections for the council are held every four years.

December 2008 by-election

A by-election was held for two vacant seats on the council after the resignation of one, and disqualification of another Conservative councillor.  The Conservative Party fielded two candidates against two Independent candidates who stood under the banner 'Former Councillor'.  The Labour Party and Liberal Democrats chose not to field any candidates, the former instead backing the Independents.  Turnout for the election was low, with the Conservative candidates elected by a small margin.

October 2009 by-election

After the departure of a Conservative councillor, a by-election was held on 15 October 2009 for one seat on the town council.  Peter Monck, a former town councillor and Liberal Democrat candidate for Stockton South in the 1997 general election stood as an independent candidate against Paul Smith, a Conservative party candidate.

Transport

Rail

The Yarm railway station, opened in 1996, is located on Green Lane near Conyers' School, about a mile south of Yarm High Street. Yarm is also serviced by the Eaglescliffe railway station.

Viaduct

The  railway viaduct was built between 1849 and 1851 for the Leeds Northern Railway Company. Its designers were Thomas Grainger and John Bourne. It comprises seven million bricks, and has 43 arches, with the two that span the River Tees being skewed and made of stone.

Air
Teesside International Airport (MME) between Yarm and Darlington, operates internal and external flights near Middleton St George.

Road
North

North of Yarm High Street leads to a fork just outside the high street with   heading north-east, to Stockton-on-Tees, and A67/Durham Road going north-west, the  goes to the airport and Darlington.

South

The south of the high street links to the current . The roundabout  and heads east to the Blue Bell roundabout in Middlesbrough and west towards Richmond.

Bus

Religion

Yarm Parish Church is the Anglican parish church, dedicated to St Mary Magdalene.  It is situated on West Street, where there has been a church on the site since at least the 9th century. It was last rebuilt from the remains of the second, Norman, church in 1730. It is a Grade II* listed building.
The Roman Catholic (RC) church of Ss Mary and Romuald, built in 1860, is at the south end of High Street. It is a Grade II listed building.
Yarm Methodist Church, an octagonal church built in 1763, is on Chapel Yard, on the east side of the town by the river, and is the oldest octagonal church in current use in Methodism. It is a Grade II listed building.

Sport
Yarm Rugby Club is based at Wass Way, Eaglescliffe. The club has grown significantly since forming in February 1998. They run teams and training sessions for most ages from youth to seniors. Currently playing in Durham/Northumberland 3. Yarm Wolves is a team of the North East Rugby League.

Yarm Cricket Club is situated on Leven Road, and has been in existence since 1814. It runs three senior teams in the North Yorkshire and South Durham Cricket League, and four junior sides – under 11s, under 13s, under 15s and under 17s – who all play competitive cricket throughout the season. In recent years, Yarm's third team, who play on a Sunday, have been the most successful team in the club, winning the NYSD Sunday Division 1 on several occasions, along with the League and Cup double in 2008.

Yarm and Eaglescliffe FC play in the North Riding Football League, it was established in 2017. Other sports facilities within Yarm include 4G football pitch, located at Conyers' School.  This facility is operated by the Go-Sport group and has been the home ground for local adult and youth football clubs, including Yarm FC and Yarm Town Juniors.  In 2016, the Go-Sport group hosted an FA-accredited 11-a-side Midweek Football League, contested by various local clubs, including TIBS F.C. from Thornaby and Ingleby Barwick. The winners of this inaugural trophy were L&H F.C., who had a 3–1 victory in the final.

Community and culture
A charter to hold a weekly market was granted by King John in 1207. It is held on the second Sunday of each month. The market charter gave Yarm its historic status as a town.

Many events are held in the town each year such as a Gala, Fair and a 5 km Fun Run.  After lying dormant for almost 100 years the Yarm Gala restarted in 2008.

Fair

A fair is held in High Street in the third week in October.  It starts on the Tuesday evening, and is officially opened on the Thursday.  It lasts until Saturday night.  It was once a commercial fair that traded in cheese and livestock, but is now primarily a funfair.  Travellers still attend the fair and ride horses up and down the street on the Saturday.  The travellers have to wait outside the town until 6:00 pm on the Tuesday, at which point they are allowed to cross the bridge over the River Tees into the town.

Venues
The Princess Alexandra Auditorium is a 750-seat venue opened in 2012 as a part of Yarm School’s redevelopment. A smaller Friarage Theatre is also on the site, with a 140-seat capacity.

Education
There are three primary schools in the town:
 Levendale (single form entry)
 Yarm Primary School (two form entry)
 Layfield Primary School (single form entry)

Conyers' School, with about 1,400 pupils, is a mixed comprehensive school; it has also a sixth-form.  It was founded in 1594 as 'the Free Grammar School' by Thomas Conyers.  Following the change to comprehensive education, it was renamed to reflect its founder.  Conyers' School is a specialist school for mathematics and computing.

The town is home to the independent Yarm School with about 1,200 pupils; the senior school being situated at the Friarage, and the preparatory school and nursery at the old Yarm Grammar School.  The school was founded in 1978, some time after the re-designation of the original grammar school.  The school had plans to move within the next decade to a site near to their playing fields on Green Lane, south of the town.  However, planning permission was not granted by the local council, and Yarm School is no longer planning to move, instead choosing to renovate and improve the current site.

Notable people

 Tom Brown, hero of the Battle of Dettingen and the last man to be knighted on the battlefield.  His house survives on the High Street and dates from around 1480, the oldest standing dwelling in the former County of Cleveland
 Graham Farrow, playwright and screenwriter
 Janick Gers, Iron Maiden guitarist 
 William Halton (cricketer) was born at Yarm
 Gaizka Mendieta, footballer

Twinned towns

Yarm is twinned with two other European towns:
  Schwalbach am Taunus, Germany
  Vernouillet, France (since 1985)

There is also an agreement with Olkusz, in Poland.

On 2 July 2005, two trees were planted to the north of the town hall to mark the 20th anniversary of the twinning between Yarm and the two towns. The trees were marked with plaques.

Notes

References

Sources

External links

 
Market towns in North Yorkshire
Towns in North Yorkshire
Civil parishes in North Yorkshire
Places in the Tees Valley
Borough of Stockton-on-Tees